Nima (Persian: نیما) is a Persian male given name popular in Iran. It is also a popular female given name in India meaning "moon" and is derivative of the Sanskrit given name "Purnima," meaning "full" (pur) + "moon" (nima).

It also has a meaning in old Tabari or Mazandarani, which is "chosen archer" and also simply "archer".

Etymology

Persian
There are different interpretations of what "Nima" stands for in Persian. It could mean 'famous, renowned', deriving from Middle Persian nāmik (nām 'name' + -ik 'adjective suffix'; 'a person of good name'). It could also mean 'half moon', a compound of nīm 'half' + māh 'moon'. Alternatively it could be a compound of nē 'no, not' + man 'I, me, human being' meaning 'no man'. According to Dehkhoda dictionary it could also mean 'just', 'someone who treats others fairly'.

In other languages

In Tibetan Nima (also spelled as "Nyima") is also a female or male given name which means 'the sun', also the one with radiance of the Sun. And in Hebrew as a female given name it means 'grace, mercy'.

People
People named Nima include:

Nima (politician) (born 1978/1979), Bhutanese politician
Nima Arkani Hamed, Iranian-American-Canadian 
Nima Fakhrara, Iranian film composer
Nima Nakisa, Iranian footballer
Nima Qavidel, Iranian footballer
Nima Gholam Ali Pour (born 1981), Iranian-born Swedish journalist and politician
Nima Rumba, a singer from Nepal
Nima Yooshij, contemporary Persian and Tabarian poet

See also

Nia (given name)
Nina (name)
Niña (name)
 Nyima (disambiguation) which includes person(s) with that name

Persian masculine given names
Arabic unisex given names